Peter Beames (born 13 September 1963) is an Australian former athlete.

An accountant by profession, Beames was Australia's national champion in the triple jump from 1985 to 1988. He was also a New Zealand national title holder. His best legal jump of 16.58m was set in Brisbane in 1988.

Beames was a triple jump bronze medalist at the 1986 Commonwealth Games in Edinburgh, finishing behind English jumpers John Herbert and Mike Makin. Other performances included sixth place at the 1985 Pacific Conference Games, eighth at the 1985 IAAF World Cup and 14th at the 1987 IAAF World Indoor Championships.

References

External links
Peter Beames at World Athletics

1963 births
Living people
Australian male triple jumpers
Commonwealth Games medallists in athletics
Commonwealth Games bronze medallists for Australia
Athletes (track and field) at the 1986 Commonwealth Games
Medallists at the 1986 Commonwealth Games